The Malaysia Ice Hockey Federation (MIHF) is the governing body of ice hockey in Malaysia.

References

External links

International Ice Hockey Federation

Ice hockey governing bodies in Asia
Ice Hockey
International Ice Hockey Federation members
Sports governing bodies in Malaysia